This is a List of exoplanets discovered in 2012.
For exoplanets detected only by radial velocity, the mass value is actually a lower limit. (See Minimum mass for more information)

Specific exoplanet lists

References

2012

exoplanets